In the Eurocode series of European standards (EN) related to construction, Eurocode 7: Geotechnical design (abbreviated EN 1997 or, informally, EC 7) describes how to design geotechnical structures, using the limit state design philosophy. It is published in two parts; "General rules" and "Ground investigation and testing". It was approved by the European Committee for Standardization (CEN) on 12 June 2006. Like other Eurocodes, it became mandatory in member states in March 2010.

Eurocode 7 is intended to:
be used in conjunction with EN 1990, which establishes the principles and requirements for safety and serviceability, describes the basis of design and verification and gives guidelines for related aspects of structural reliability,
be applied to the geotechnical aspects of the design of buildings and civil engineering works and it is concerned with the requirements for strength, stability, serviceability and durability of structures.

Eurocode 7 is composed of the following parts

Part 1: General rules
EN 1997-1 is intended to be used as a general basis for the geotechnical aspects of the design of buildings and civil engineering works.

Contents
 General
 Basis of design
 Geotechnical data
 Supervision of construction, monitoring and maintenance
 Fill, dewatering, ground improvement and reinforcement
 Spread foundations
 Deep foundation (pile foundations)
 Anchorages
 Retaining structures
 Hydraulic failure
 Overall stability
 Embankments

EN 1997-1 is accompanied by Annexes A to J, which provide:
Annex A Recommended partial safety factor values; different values of the partial factors may be set by the National annex.
Annexes B to J Supplementary informative guidance such as internationally applied calculation methods.

Part 2: Ground investigation and testing
EN 1997-2 is intended to be used in conjunction with EN 1997-1 and provides rules supplementary to EN 1997-1 related to planning and reporting of ground investigations, general requirements for a range of commonly used laboratory and field tests, interpretation and evaluation of test results and derivation of values of geotechnical parameters and coefficients.

Part 3: Design assisted by field testing
There is no longer a Part 3. It was amalgamated into EN 1997-2

References

External links 
 Eurocodes: Building the Future The European Commission Website on the EN Eurocodes
Eurocodes Expert UK construction industry website with comprehensive information and support resources for implementation of the BS EN Eurocodes.
A Designers' Simple Guide to BS EN 1997 UK design guide with several worked examples using EN 1997.
EN 1997: Geotechnical design
EN 1997: Geotechnical design - "Eurocodes: Background and applications" workshop

Geology
Geotechnical engineering
Civil engineering
01997
Reinforced concrete
7
2010 in the European Union